State Route 26 (SR 26) is an east–west highway in Middle Tennessee. The road begins in Lebanon and ends in Sparta.

Route description

Wilson County

The highway runs an unsigned concurrency with U.S. Route 70 for its entire existence. It begins at an intersection with U.S. Route 70 Business and US 70 in Lebanon as US 70 and State Route 24 move east from Mt. Juliet. SR 26 moves around north Lebanon with US 70 as SR 24 continues with Business 70 through downtown Lebanon. At this point, SR 26/US 70 is known as West Baddour Pkwy and later as East High St. SR 26 then continues south on the east side of town as Sparta Pike, intersecting SR 24 once more, this time it is concurrent with US 70N, before leaving Lebanon. The concurrency moves southeast, passing under Interstate 40 on its way to Watertown.

DeKalb County

SR 26/US 70 continues through Watertown and moves into DeKalb County, becoming Nashville Highway as it moves through the towns of Alexandria, Liberty, and Dowelltown. During this time SR 26/US 70 runs two concurrencies with SR 53 (from Liberty to Alexandria) and SR 96 (from Liberty to just west of Smithville) with the routes briefly overlapping in Liberty so that all four routes run together.

After leaving Dowelltown, the highways go up a hill and end the concurrency with SR 96 at the top. SR 26/US 70 moves through Smithville as West Broad St, later East Broad St, and moves east, becoming Sparta Highway as it does so. It then crosses Center Hill Lake and moves into White County.

White County

It moves into the west side of Sparta and becomes West Brockman Way before having an interchange with SR 111 and US 70S, where US 70S ends, before entering downtown and coming to an end at an intersection with SR 1, which US 70 continues east concurrent with towards Crossville.

Major intersections

See also 
List of state routes in Tennessee

References 

U.S. Route 70
026
026
026
026